The 1948 Syracuse Orangemen football team represented Syracuse University as an independent during the 1948 college football season. The Orangemen were led by second-year head coach Reaves Baysinger and played their home games at Archbold Stadium in Syracuse, New York. After a dismal 1–8 season, Baysinger was fired.

Schedule

References

Syracuse
Syracuse Orange football seasons
Syracuse Orangemen football